Genevieve Pitot (May 20, 1901 – October 4, 1980) was an American musician, composer, pianist and dancer.

Biography
Pitot was born in New Orleans in 1901. One of her ancestors was James Pitot, the mayor of New Orleans. Pitot went to Paris to train as a classical pianist and began working in musical theatre when she worked for Martha Graham. Pitot was best known for both arranging and composing the music  for Hanya Holm, Jerome Robbins and Michael Kidd, and Broadway musical pieces including "Kiss Me, Kate", "Shangri La" and "Li'l Abner." She composed for Helen Tamiris, Agnes de Mille, Donald Saddler.

Pitot married New Yorker Joseph P. Sullivan. She died in New Orleans in 1980. Her papers are kept in Tulane University.

Sources

1901 births
1980 deaths
Musicians from New Orleans
20th-century American women musicians